The 2000 United States presidential election in Maryland took place on November 7, 2000. Maryland participated in the 2000 United States presidential election along with the 49 other U.S. states and Washington, D.C. Voters chose 10 representatives, or electors, to the Electoral College, who voted for the President and Vice President.

Democratic Vice President Al Gore easily carried Maryland on election day, taking 56.57% of the vote to Republican Texas Governor George W. Bush’s 40.18%. Maryland was the only state where, along with Washington, D.C., Gore improved on Bill Clinton's margin  four years earlier Gore's strong performance in the most highly-populated counties in the state, which are home to many urban and African American communities, contributed to his victory in the state. Gore became the first Democrat to carry Charles County since 1976; it was one of only two counties in the country to vote for Gore after having voted for Bob Dole in 1996, the other being Orange County, Florida. This was the first time since 1888 that Maryland gave a majority of the vote to a losing candidate.  Maryland was 1 of 10 states that backed George H. W. Bush in 1988 that George W. Bush did not carry in either of his presidential runs.

Results

Results by county

Counties that flipped from Republican to Democratic
Charles (largest town: Waldorf)

Counties that flipped from Democratic to Republican
Dorchester (largest town: Cambridge)
Kent (largest town: Chestertown)

Results by congressional district
Gore won 5 of the state's 8 congressional districts, including one that elected a Republican.

Electors

Technically the voters of Maryland cast their ballots for electors: representatives to the Electoral College. Maryland is allocated 10 electors because it has 8 congressional districts and 2 senators. All candidates who appear on the ballot or qualify to receive write-in votes must submit a list of 10 electors, who pledge to vote for their candidate and his or her running mate. Whoever wins a plurality of votes in the state is awarded all ten electoral votes. Their chosen electors then vote for president and vice president. Although electors are pledged to their candidate and running mate, they are not obligated to vote for them. An elector who votes for someone other than his or her candidate is known as a faithless elector.

The electors of each state and the District of Columbia met on December 18, 2000 to cast their votes for president and vice president. The Electoral College itself never meets as one body. Instead the electors from each state and the District of Columbia met in their respective capitols. 

The following were the members of the Electoral College from the state. All were pledged to and voted for Gore and Lieberman:
Clarence W. Blount
Gene W. Counihan
Howard Friedman
Mary Ann E. Love
Thomas V. Mike Miller
Mary Butler Murphy
Mary Jo Neville
Gregory Pecoraro
Ina Taylor
Beatrice P. Tignor

See also
 United States presidential elections in Maryland
 2000 United States presidential election
 2000 United States elections

Notes

References 

Maryland
2000
Presidential